Col, or Lembak (also known as ), is a Malayic language from Sumatra. It is spoken by around 145,000 speakers (2000) with most speakers found in Lubuklinggau Municipality, South Sumatra, and the areas surrounding it, all the way to Musi Rawas in South Sumatra. The speakers of this language belong to the Lembak ethnic group, a small ethnic group closely related to ethnic Malays, especially those of Bengkulu and Palembang Malays. Col is closely related to Palembang Malay and Bengkulu Malay with minor differences mostly in pronunciation. Bengkulu Malay and Palembang Malay tend to end words with "o" while Col usually ends them with "e". The language has its own ISO code, .

References

Languages of Indonesia
Agglutinative languages
Malay dialects

Malayic languages